The Song of My Life is the second studio album by Filipino singer-actress Nora Aunor, released in 1971 by Alpha Records Corporation in the Philippines in LP format and later released in 1999 in a compilation/ cd format.   The album contains 12 tracks among them is  "Lollipops and Roses" that team up with the teen idol Victor "Cocoy" Laurel and they even made a movie which became one of the biggest box office hits of the seventies.

Background
This album collection will delight and refresh the hardest soul and ensure the enjoyment of Nora Aunor's thousand of fans once more whose career as a singer flourished through simple sincerity of her singing style.  So sit back and capture the ambiance of her music at its best in your own home - From "The Song of My Life" album Cover

Track listing

Side One

Side Two

Album Credits 
Arranged and Conducted by:

 Doming Valdez
 The Song of My Life
 Losing You
 My Prayer
 I Just Can't Help Believing
 Me, The Peaceful Heart
 Restie Umali
 Lollipops and Roses
 The Things We Did Last Summer
 Theme for a New Love

Arranged and Supervised by:
 Danny Subido
 We Miss You
 We've Only Just Begun
 Leaving on a Jet Plane
 Now and Then

Recording Engineer
 Rick L. Santos

References 

Nora Aunor albums
1971 albums